Montgomery County is a county located in the U.S. state of Mississippi. As of the 2020 census, the population was 9,822. Its county seat is Winona.

The county is said to be named in honor either of Richard Montgomery, an American Revolutionary War general killed in 1775 while attempting to capture Quebec City, Canada, or for Montgomery County, Tennessee, from which an early settler came. In the latter case, it would have been indirectly named after John Montgomery, a settler in Montgomery County, Tennessee, who founded the city of Clarksville, Tennessee, in the same county.

The Big Black River passes through the southern part of the county, flowing southwest to its confluence with the Mississippi River south of Vicksburg.

Geography
It is the fourth-smallest county in Mississippi by total area.

Major highways
  Interstate 55
  U.S. Route 51
  U.S. Route 82

Adjacent counties
 Grenada County (north)
 Webster County (northeast)
 Choctaw County (east)
 Attala County (south)
 Carroll County (west)

History
This area was occupied in historic times by the Choctaw people. Their ancestors had inhabited the area for thousands of years. Under the Indian Removal Act of 1830, the United States forced most of the Native Americans west of the Mississippi River in order to open their lands to settlement by European Americans.

Much of the area of present-day Montgomery County was developed for cotton plantations before and after the Civil War, when it was still part of Choctaw County. Most of the labor was supplied by African Americans, enslaved before the war and freed afterward. The county was organized by the legislature in 1871, during the Reconstruction era. The eastern hilly areas became a center of timber industry.

From 1877 to 1950, there were 10 known lynchings of blacks in the county, fewer than in many other counties of the state. It was a form of racial terrorism that was at its height at the turn of the 20th century. Some studies have shown that the rate of lynchings related to economic stresses among whites. Beginning in 1890, Mississippi and other southern states largely excluded blacks from the formal political system by disenfranchisement, creating barriers to voter registration through constitutional amendments and other laws.

On April 13, 1937, two African-American men, Roosevelt Townes and "Bootjack" McDaniels, were arraigned at the county courthouse in Winona, after being charged in the December 1936 murder of a white merchant in Duck Hill, after Townes purportedly confessed to police. They were abducted from the courthouse and lynched. A white crowd estimated at 100 had gathered on April 13. A group of 12 white men took the two blacks by school bus to a site in Duck Hill, where they were tortured to confess before being shot and burned to death. A crowd estimated at 300 to 500 whites gathered to watch. By 1 pm, the wire services and other national media had learned of the event and were trying to gain more information. 

The lynchings were reported nationally in the United States and widely condemned. Representative Hatton W. Sumners (D-Texas), chairman of the House Judiciary Committee, sent a telegram to Governor Hugh L. White decrying the lynching. He said, "It is the sort of thing which makes it hard for those of us who are here trying to protect the governmental sovereignty of the state..." At the time a federal anti-lynching bill was under consideration by Congress. It passed the House, but it was defeated in the Senate by the Solid South, conservative white Democrats. As was typical of lynchings, no one was ever prosecuted for the murders. Nazi Germany reported the lynching, comparing it to the "humanism" of its anti-Semitic laws.

As in much of rural Mississippi, population in this county declined markedly from 1910 to 1920, and from 1940 to 1970. The peak of population in the county was in 1910. In addition to labor changes because of mechanization of agriculture, blacks left in two waves of the Great Migration out of the rural and small town South seeking jobs, education, relief from Jim Crow and violence, and better opportunities in other regions. As a result, Mississippi changed from majority black (56%) in population in 1910 to majority white (63%) by 1970.

Demographics

2020 census

As of the 2020 United States census, there were 9,822 people, 4,539 households, and 3,064 families residing in the county.

2010 census
As of the 2010 United States Census, there were 10,925 people living in the county. 53.0% were White, 45.5% Black or African American, 0.4% Asian, 0.1% Native American, 0.5% of some other race and 0.5% of two or more races. 0.9% were Hispanic or Latino (of any race).

2000 census
As of the census of 2000, there were 12,189 people, 4,690 households, and 3,367 families living in the county.  The population density was 30 people per square mile (12/km2).  There were 5,402 housing units at an average density of 13 per square mile (5/km2).  The racial makeup of the county was 54.25% White, 44.95% Black or African American, 0.08% Native American, 0.25% Asian, 0.02% Pacific Islander, 0.07% from other races, and 0.37% from two or more races. 0.85% of the population were Hispanic or Latino of any race.

According to the census of 2000, the largest ancestry groups in Montgomery County were African 44.95%, English 42.1%,  and Scots-Irish 1%.

There were 4,690 households, out of which 32.60% had children under the age of 18 living with them, 48.50% were married couples living together, 18.80% had a female householder with no husband present, and 28.20% were non-families. 26.10% of all households were made up of individuals, and 13.60% had someone living alone who was 65 years of age or older.  The average household size was 2.57 and the average family size was 3.10.

In the county, the population was spread out, with 26.80% under the age of 18, 8.90% from 18 to 24, 25.30% from 25 to 44, 22.40% from 45 to 64, and 16.70% who were 65 years of age or older.  The median age was 37 years. For every 100 females there were 86.40 males.  For every 100 females age 18 and over, there were 81.10 males.

The median income for a household in the county was $25,270, and the median income for a family was $31,602. Males had a median income of $26,590 versus $17,639 for females. The per capita income for the county was $14,040.  About 21.90% of families and 24.30% of the population were below the poverty line, including 34.80% of those under age 18 and 25.40% of those age 65 or over.

Education 
 Public School Districts
 Winona-Montgomery Consolidated School District  - Consolidation of the Winona district and the Montgomery County School District, effective 2018.
 Private Schools
 Winona Christian School

Communities

Cities
 Winona (county seat)

Towns
 Duck Hill
 Kilmichael

Census-designated place
 Stewart

Unincorporated communities
 Alva
 Huntsville
 Lodi
 Poplar Creek
 Silbeyton
 Sweatman

Ghost town
 Middleton

Notable residents
 Fannie Lou Hamer - Civil rights activist, with the Mississippi Freedom Democratic Party in 1964; born in Montgomery County in 1917, moved to Sunflower County in 1919.

Politics

See also

 National Register of Historic Places listings in Montgomery County, Mississippi

References

 
Mississippi counties
Counties of Appalachia
1871 establishments in Mississippi
Populated places established in 1871